Ram Shankar (born 1938) is a former Fijian international lawn bowler.

Bowls career
Shankar has represented Fiji at the Commonwealth Games, in the fours event at the 1998 Commonwealth Games.

He won a silver medal at the Asia Pacific Bowls Championships in the 1995 fours in Dunedin, New Zealand.

He was the Vice President of the Fiji Association of Sport and National Olympic Committee from 1997-2003.

References

Fijian male bowls players
1938 births
Living people
Bowls players at the 1998 Commonwealth Games